Corunastylis capparina is a small terrestrial orchid endemic to Victoria. It is one of the midge orchids and has a single thin leaf fused to the flowering stem and up to twenty small, green flowers with purple markings. It is a rare species, found only in a small area in the south-east of the state.

Description
Corunastylis capparina is a terrestrial, perennial, deciduous, herb with an underground tuber and a single thin leaf fused to the flowering stem. As with others in the genus, the flowers are inverted so that the labellum is above the column rather than below it. There is a narrow egg-shaped callus in the centre of the labellum and extending almost to its tip. Flowering occurs in March and April.

Taxonomy and naming
Corunastylis capparina was first formally described in 2016 by David Jones from a specimen collected in the Blond Bay Wildlife Reserve and the description was published in the Australian Orchid Review. The specific epithet (capparina) is a vague Latin word meaning greenish-brown, referring to the colour of the flowers of this species.

Julian Shaw has proposed changing the name of this orchid to Genoplesium capparinum. The World Checklist of Selected Plant Families lists both Genoplesium capparinum and Corunastyis capparina as "unplaced names".

Distribution and habitat
This midge orchid grows in heath and heathy forest between Sale and Bairnsdale.

References

capparina
Endemic orchids of Australia
Orchids of Victoria (Australia)
Plants described in 2016